The 2022 GP Miguel Induráin was the 68th edition of the GP Miguel Induráin road cycling one day race, which was held on 2 April 2022, starting and finishing in Estella.

Teams 
Ten of the eighteen UCI WorldTeams, nine UCI ProTeams, and two UCI Continental teams made up the twenty-one teams that participated in the race. Several teams elected to compete with less than the maximum of seven riders allowed.

UCI WorldTeams

 
 
 
 
 
 
 
 
 
 

UCI ProTeams

 
 
 
 
 
 
 
 
 

UCI Continental Teams

Result

Notes 

As of 1 March 2022, the UCI announced that cyclists from Russia and Belarus would no longer compete under the name or flag of those respective countries due to the Russian invasion of Ukraine.

References

External links 
 

2022
GP Miguel Induráin
GP Miguel Induráin
GP Miguel Induráin
GP Miguel Induráin